Whitestone is a small village in Devon, England, approximately 4 miles west of Exeter. It is in the parish of Whitestone; one of the 45 parish and town councils of Teignbridge District Council.

Details of all Whitestone clubs, events and history can be found on the village website.

It is the village where Chris Martin of Coldplay was raised.

References

External links

Villages in Devon